This is a list of parks in the city of San Diego, California:

List of parks

Allied Gardens Community Park
Amici Park
Balboa Park (cultural park)
Belmont Park (historic theme park)
Black Mountain Open Space Park
Cabrillo National Monument (admission fee)
Chicano Park
Children's Park
Chollas Lake Park
Clay Park
County Administration Center Waterfront Park
Cowles Mountain
Cypress Canyon Park
Dog Beach (off-leash dog area in Ocean Beach )
Dusty Rhodes Park (with off-leash dog area)
Famosa Slough State Marine Conservation Area(natural wetland preserve)
Jerabek Park
Kate Sessions Park
Liberty Station waterfront park
Los Peñasquitos Canyon Preserve
Marion Bear Park
Martin Luther King Jr. Promenade
Mission Bay Park
Mission Trails Regional Park
Mount Soledad
Murray Ridge Neighborhood Park
Old Town San Diego State Historic Park
Otay Valley Regional Park
Pantoja Park (A San Diego Historic Landmark)
Point Loma Native Plant Garden
Presidio Park
Rancho Bernardo Community Park (with off-leash dog area)
Robb Field (athletic fields and skateboard park)
Rose Canyon Open Space Park
Ruocco Park
San Diego River Park
San Dieguito River Park
San Diego Zoo (admission fee)
San Diego Zoo Safari Park (admission fee)
San Pasqual / Clevenger Canyon Open Space Park
SeaWorld San Diego (admission fee)
Spanish Landing Park
Sunset Cliffs Natural Park
Sycamore Canyon County Park
Tecolote Canyon Natural Park and Nature Center
Torrey Pines City Park a part of the Torrey Pines Gliderport
Torrey Pines State Reserve

References 

 
parks
San Diego